is a third-sector railway transportation company headquartered in Date, Fukushima, Japan.

History
AbukumaExpress was founded on April 5, 1984, as a third-sector railway for the purpose of taking over operation of Japanese National Railways' Marumori Line, which ran 17.4 km and linked Marumori Station to Tsukinoki Station.

The Marumori Line was reopened as the Abukuma Express Line on July 1, 1986, operated by AbukumaExpress. The Abukuma Express Line was extended to Fukushima Station in the south from July 1, 1988.

Operations

AbukumaExpress operates the Abukuma Express Line, which runs 54.9 km from Fukushima Station in the south to Tsukinoki Station in the north.

Rolling stock
 (1986–1988)
 (former ; October 2008 – March 2016)
 (since 1988)
AB900 series (since July 2019)

Ownership
The shareholders of AbukumaExpress consist primarily of local and prefectural governments.

See also
List of railway companies in Japan

References

External links

  for AbukumaExpress

Railway companies of Japan
Abukuma Express Line
Companies based in Fukushima Prefecture
Date, Fukushima
1984 establishments in Japan
Japanese third-sector railway lines